Sarada (born Saraswati Devi; 25 June 1945) is an Indian actress and politician. Known for her work predominantly in Malayalam films and Telugu films , Sarada is the recipient of three National Awards. She has also appeared in few Tamil, Hindi as well as Kannada language films. She is also known as Urvasi Sarada as National Film Award for Best Actress was officially designated the Urvasi Award. She won three National Awards for her roles in Thulabharam (1968), Swayamvaram (1972), and Nimajjanam (1977). Sarada has garnered the NTR National Award by the Government of Andhra Pradesh for her contributions to Indian cinema.

Early life
Sarada was born Saraswati Devi in Tenali, Guntur, Andhra Pradesh, India. Her parents Venkateswar Rao and Satyavathi Devi belonged to a family of agriculturalists. She has a brother, named Mohan Rao. Sarada was sent to Madras in her childhood to live with her grandmother Kanakamma. Sarada describes her grandmother as a "strict disciplinarian" who in the later days "wouldn't even let the heroes touch her" and allowed "rehearsals only on Sundays". Sarada started to learn dance when she was six. She used to perform during Dasara and other temple festivals. It was because of her mother's desire that she learned dance. Her mother wanted her to become a "big star in cine field". Though Sarada's father was not too interested in the idea, he did not stop her. Sarada married Telugu actor Chalam, the couple later divorced. Currently Sarada is living with her brother's family in Chennai.

Early career

When she grew up, she started acting in Telugu theatre. Her debut in cinema was with a minor role in the Telugu film Kanyasulkam. However, she returned to theatre after that and did a major role in the Telugu version of Rakta Kanneeru, a Tamil drama. The play went to get staged over 100 times in Tamil Nadu.

Film career

In 1959, she began her career as Sarada. The change in name was attributed to the presence of a few other actors in the industry with the devotional name, Saraswati. She came under contract to L.V. Prasad, a Telugu producer. Though she didn't get to act in any of his films, she got her formal training in acting under him, including the Navarasa lessons. She largely attributes her performances and growth in the field to this training. Her first break came with the Akkineni Nageswara Rao starrer Iddaru Mitrulu, which was a major hit. Noted for the role in the film, she got chances from Tamil and Malayalam films as well.

The year 1965 changed her career as Sarada carved her niche for herself in the Malayalam film industry with her performances in Shakuntala, Murappennu, Udhyogastha by P. Venu, Kattu Thulasi and Inapravukal. After that, she focused in Malayalam films, acting only a few roles in other languages. Recognition came in 1967 in the form of a national honorary award for her performances in various films of 1966 including Iruttinte Athmavu. The award was the predecessor to the National Film Award for Best Actress, which was instituted in 1968. In 1969, she won her first National Film Award for Best Actress for her performance in Thulabharam. She went on to win the award 2 more times, for Swayamvaram (1972, Malayalam) and Nimajjanam (1978, Telugu). She also won the Kerala State Film Awards for Best Actress one time. After 1993, she became choosy and accepted only a few films. Her major films of late were Mazhathullikkilukkam (2002, Malayalam), Rappakal (2005, Malayalam), Nayika (2011, Malayalam) and Stalin (2006, Telugu).

 She owns a chocolate factory named Lotus Chocolates. She was elected as a Member of Parliament on Telugu Desam Party ticket from her native town of Tenali.

Awards

National Film Awards 
1968 - National Film Award for Best Actress : Thulabharam (Malayalam)
1972 - National Film Award for Best Actress : Swayamvaram (Malayalam)
1977 - National Film Award for Best Actress : Nimajjanam  (Telugu)

Tamil Nadu State Film Awards 
2013 - Kalaimamani for contributions to Tamil Cinema

Kerala State Film Awards 
1970 -  Kerala State Film Award for Best Actress – Thriveni & Thara

Filmfare Awards South 
 1987 - Filmfare Award for Best Actress – Malayalam : Oru Minnaminunginte Nurunguvettam
 1997 – Lifetime Achievement Award

Nandi Awards 
 1984 - Nandi Award for Best Supporting Actress - Bobbili Brahmanna
 2010 - NTR National Award for Lifetime Achievement

Other Awards 
 1970 - Bengal Film Journalists' Association (BFJA) Award for Best Actress in Hindi – Samaj Ko Badal Dalo
 2017 - Prem Nazir Award
 1999 - Doctorate from Potti Sreeramulu Telugu University, Hyderabad
 2020 - Vanitha Film Awards - Lifetime Achievement Award

Notable filmography

Telugu

Malayalam

Tamil

Hindi

Kannada

See also
 Sheela
 Jayabharathi

References

External links
 

Living people
1945 births
Telugu actresses
Indian film actresses
Actresses in Tamil cinema
Actresses in Kannada cinema
Actresses in Hindi cinema
India MPs 1996–1997
Actresses from Andhra Pradesh
Actresses in Telugu cinema
Indian actor-politicians
Actresses in Malayalam cinema
People from Guntur district
Best Actress National Film Award winners
Kerala State Film Award winners
Filmfare Awards South winners
Lok Sabha members from Andhra Pradesh
Women in Andhra Pradesh politics
20th-century Indian women politicians
20th-century Indian politicians
21st-century Indian women politicians
21st-century Indian politicians
People from Tenali
Women members of the Lok Sabha
Telugu Desam Party politicians
Indian stage actresses
Actresses in Telugu theatre
20th-century Indian actresses
21st-century Indian actresses